Dwarf toad may refer to several different species or genera of amphibians.

Bufonidae – genera:

Bufonidae – species:

Pipidae – species:

Animal common name disambiguation pages